Nottebohm is a German surname meaning "nut tree". Notable people with the surname include:

Andreas Nottebohm (born 1944), American-German artist
Gustav Nottebohm (1817–1882), German classical pianist, teacher and musical editor
Fernando Nottebohm (born 1940), Argentine neuroscientist

See also 
 Nottebohm (Liechtenstein v. Guatemala)

German-language surnames